Dudley Knowles (1947, Lancashire – 26 October 2014) was a British political philosopher and professor at Glasgow University. He was widely known for his influential book Political Philosophy (2001).

Publications 

Books

2001 Political Philosophy (Routledge/McGill University Press)
2002 Hegel and the Philosophy of Right (Routledge)
2009 Political Obligation: A Critical Introduction (Routledge)

Books edited

1990 Explanation and its Limits (Cambridge University Press) 
1993 (with John Skorupski), Virtue and Taste (Blackwell) 
2009 G.W.F. Hegel (Ashgate)

External links 
 University of Glasgow - Dudley Knowles

Further reading

Political philosophers
Philosophy academics
Academics of the University of Glasgow
British philosophers
Alumni of the University of Glasgow
People from Penwortham
Alumni of Bedford College, London
2014 deaths
1947 births